Calcutt, Calcott or Callcott may refer to:

Places in England 
 Calcott, Kent 
 Calcutt, North Yorkshire
 Calcott, Shropshire
 Calcutt, one of three hamlets comprising Grandborough, Warwickshire
 Calcutt, Wiltshire
 Calcott's Green, Gloucestershire

Company
 Calcott Brothers, former motor vehicle manufacturer in Coventry, England

People 
 Augustus Wall Callcott (1779–1844), British landscape painter
 Callcott Reilly (1828–1900), British engineer
 David Calcutt (1930–2004), British barrister and public servant
 Ernie Calcutt (1932–1984), Canadian sports commentator and radio news director
 Florence Callcott (1866–1936), British artist and sculptor, wife of Frederick
 Frederick T. Callcott (1854–1923), British sculptor
 Helen Calcutt (born 1988), British poet and writer
 John Callcott Horsley (1817–1903), English Academic painter of genre and historical scenes, illustrator, and designer of the first Christmas card
 John Wall Callcott (1766–1821), British composer, brother of Augustus Wall Callcott
  William Hutchins Callcott (1807–1882), British composer, son of John Wall Callcott